Josquin des Prez ( – 1521) was a composer of High Renaissance music

Josquin may also refer to

People
 Josquin Baston, Dutch composer
 Josquin Dor, Franco-Flemish singer and composer in the court of Matthias Corvinus
 Josquin Des Pres, French-born American musical artist